Qaleh Fulad (also Romanized as Qal‘eh Fūlād and Qal‘eh-ye Fūlād; also known as Qal‘eh-ye Pūlā and Qalla Pola) is a village in Yeylan-e Shomali Rural District, in the Central District of Dehgolan County, Kurdistan Province, Iran. At the 2006 census, its population was 166, in 41 families. The village is populated by Kurds.

References 

Towns and villages in Dehgolan County
Kurdish settlements in Kurdistan Province